is a Japanese politician of the Liberal Democratic Party, a member of the House of Representatives (2003-2005: Southern Kanto proportional representation block, 2005-2009 and 2012–present: Kanagawa 18th district) in the Diet (national legislature). He served as Minister in charge of Economic Revitalization under the cabinet of Prime Minister Fumio Kishida from October 2021 to October 2022.

Career
A native of Kamakura, Kanagawa, Yamagiwa graduated from Yamaguchi University and received a Ph.D in veterinary medicine from the University of Tokyo. After working as a veterinarian, he was elected to the House of Representatives for the first time in 2003.

Within the LDP, Yamagiwa has served as Parliamentary Secretary of Cabinet Office, and as a member of the Committee on Cabinet.

On 10 August 2022, seven ministers were purged because of ties to the Unification Church following the assassination of Shinzo Abe and increasing media scrutiny of LDP officials' close ties with the church. The Kishida administration had asked ministers to disclose any connections to the church prior to reshuffling the second cabinet. After the new cabinet was formed Yamagiwa announced that he had previously paid membership fees and attended a Unification Church event. He resigned from his cabinet position on 24 October 2022, expressing regret for his actions and stating that he will remain as a member of the Diet because he did not do anything illegal.

Positions
Yamagiwa is affiliated to the openly revisionist lobby Nippon Kaigi, and a member of the Shintō Seiji Renmei Diet group.

Yamagiwa gave the following answers to the questionnaire submitted by Mainichi to parliamentarians in 2012:
in favor of the revision of the Constitution
in favor of right of collective self-defense (revision of Article 9)
in favor of reform of the National assembly (unicameral instead of bicameral)
in favor of reactivating nuclear power plants
against the goal of zero nuclear power by 2030s
in favor of the relocation of Marine Corps Air Station Futenma (Okinawa)
in favor of a strong attitude versus China
in favor of the reform of the Imperial Household that would allow women to retain their Imperial status even after marriage
should start considering a nuclear-armed Japan
no answer regarding the participation of Japan to the Trans-Pacific Partnership

References

External links
 Official website in Japanese.

Living people
People from Kamakura
1968 births
Members of Nippon Kaigi
Liberal Democratic Party (Japan) politicians
Members of the House of Representatives (Japan)
21st-century Japanese politicians
Government ministers of Japan